The 1988–89 Michigan State Spartans men's basketball team represented Michigan State University in the 1988–89 NCAA Division I men's basketball season. The team played their home games at Jenison Field House in East Lansing, Michigan and were members of the Big Ten Conference. They were coached by Jud Heathcote in his 13th year at Michigan State. This season marked the Spartans' final season of basketball at Jenison Fieldhouse before moving to their current venue, the Breslin Center, the following season. The Spartans finished the season 18–15, 6–12 in Big Ten play to finish in eighth place. Michigan State received a bid to the National Invitation Tournament where they beat Kent State, Wichita State, and Villanova to reach the semifinals at Madison Square Garden. In the semifinals, they lost to Saint Louis. In the third place game, they lost to UAB in overtime.

Previous season
The Spartans finished the 1987–88 season with an overall record of 10–18, 5–13 to finish in eighth place in Big Ten play.

Roster and statistics 

Source

Schedule and results

|-
!colspan=9 style=| Non-conference regular season

|-
!colspan=9 style=| Big Ten regular season

|-
!colspan=9 style=|NIT

References

Michigan State Spartans men's basketball seasons
Michigan State
Michigan State
Michigan State Spartans men's b
Michigan State Spartans men's b